Wheat is produced in almost every state in the United States, and is one of the most grown grains in the country. The type and quantity vary between regions. The US is ranked fourth in production volume of wheat, with almost 50 million tons produced in 2020, behind only China, India and Russia. The US is ranked first in crop export volume; almost 50% of its total wheat production is exported.

The United States Department of Agriculture defines eight official classes of wheat: durum wheat, hard red spring wheat, hard red winter wheat, soft red winter wheat, hard white wheat, soft white wheat, unclassed wheat, and mixed wheat. Winter wheat accounts for 70 to 80 percent of total production in the US, with the largest amounts produced in Kansas (10.8 million tons) and North Dakota (9.8 million tons). The US hard red spring wheat crop is exported to over 70 countries each year to the extent of 55%. Of the total wheat produced in the country, 50% is exported, valued at US$9 billion.

History

According to Alexander Von Humboldt, wheat was first cultivated in New Spain by a black slave of Hernán Cortés in the 15th century who discovered a few grains of wheat in provisions of rice sent from Spain. In the Franciscan Monastery of Quito, Ecuador, a clay vessel is on display containing the first kernels of wheat which were then sowed by the Franciscan Monk, Friar Jodoc Riri de Gante at the plazuela de San Francisco in Quito. Although it was first introduced to the Western Hemisphere following the discovery of the New World, wheat came to be grown in North American soil only during the colonial period. During the colonial period, wheat was sown by broadcasting, reaped by sickles, and threshed by flails. The kernels were then taken to a grist mill for grinding into flour.

19th century

In 1830, it took four people and two oxen, working 10 hours a day, to produce 200 bushels. The geographic center of wheat-growing areas in the U.S. in 1839 was to the north and west of Washington, D.C., and spread further over time to the far west of the country. Production conditions also resulted in extending the wheat growing areas into harsher climatic regions. Data on wheat production is available for the period between 1885 and 1930. Improvements in wheat breeding in the U.S. was an activity of the state agricultural experiment stations, while the federal officials concentrated on exploring possibilities of gaining from appropriate varieties developed in other parts of the world.

After the American Civil War, the western Mississippi Valley and the Great Plains to its west, where large fertile lands were available, resulted in expanding wheat farming. By this time, better tillage equipment was in use, railroads provided better access to world markets, better trading and warehousing facilities were facilitated, and more particularly introduction of hard winter was introduced. In the 1870s, Turkey red wheat, a hard variety of wheat, was introduced to the farmlands of Kansas by Russian Mennonite immigrants. This wheat variety spread quickly. New technology substantially enhanced productivity in the 19th century, as sowing with drills replaced broadcasting, cradles took the place of sickles, and the cradles in turn were replaced by reapers and binders. Steam-powered threshing machines superseded flails. By 1895, in Bonanza farms in the Dakotas, it took six different people and 36 horses pulling huge harvesters, working 10 hours a day, to produce 20,000 bushels. Following the invention of the steel roller mill in 1878, hard varieties of wheat such as Turkey Red became more popular than soft, which had been previously preferred because they were easier for grist mills to grind.

20th century – present
Exports from 1914 to 1922 amounted to more than 200 million bushels. The annual wheat production of the United States more than tripled in the fifty years between 1871 and 1921; it increased from about 250 million bushels during the period of 1869–1871 to over 750 million during the period of 1919–1921. With recorded wheat production of more than its domestic consumption (production was as much as 2.5 times the consumption), as World War II started, wheat stocks could not be lifted and the result was its use as livestock feed and for industrial alcohol. After the war years, there were four "best" years (1945–1948) when the average annual production peaked to 1,228 million bushels, double the production of war years.

In 2002, 50% of the U.S. wheat crop was exported, while 36% was consumed by the American population, and 10% was fed to livestock, with the remaining 4% set aside for seed. Wheat harvesting occurs on land area of 60–63 million acres. Genetically modified wheat, which "is not approved for cultivation anywhere in the world", was found in an Oregon farm in June 2013. The grain was modified by Monsanto to tolerate weed killer treatments. It is not known whether the unapproved wheat is present elsewhere.

Geography

Hard red winter wheat is grown in the southern U.S. states of Kansas, Oklahoma, Texas, Nebraska, and Colorado. In the hot climatic conditions of these states, winter wheat is raised by planting in fall and harvesting in the spring, taking advantage of autumn rains. Under harsh cold weather conditions in parts of Montana, North Dakota, South Dakota, and Minnesota where winter wheat cannot be grown, the crop is planted in the spring and grows during the long summer days of the high latitudes so that it can be harvested in the fall.

Classification and uses

Of wheat grown in the United States, 36% percent is consumed domestically by humans, 50% is exported, 10% is used for livestock feed, and 4% is used for seedlings. Various American-style wheat beers are produced in the US. Wheat in the U.S. is grown under two major categories based on climate: winter wheat, and spring wheat. The majority is winter wheat, accounting for, on average, 75% of wheat production. Wheat may be further classified as follows:

Hard red winter wheat (HRW) with 40% production, used mainly in flour production, grown on the high plains which extends from Texas through the largest producing state, Kansas, and continuing all the way north to the Dakotas and Montana.
Hard red spring (HRS) wheat (also has a sub-classification of Dark Northern Spring Wheat) of high protein value, about 20% production preferred for making high quality bread is from the states of North Dakota, Montana, Minnesota, and South Dakota.
Soft red winter (SRW) wheat with an average production of 20% raised in the states of Ohio, Kentucky, Indiana, Washington, Oregon, Idaho, Michigan, New York, and the Southeast, the flour from this wheat is used in making cakes, cookies, and crackers.
White wheat, which accounts for an average of 12.5% production in the states of Washington, Oregon, Idaho, Michigan, and New York with its flour used in making products of soup noodles, crackers, cereals, and white-crusted breads.
Durum wheat, the preferred variety for making pasta; grown mostly in the states of Arizona, North Dakota and Montana to an average production level of 4%. 
The byproducts resulting from milling of all the above varieties is used to feed animals.

Enrichment
In 1941, the wheat industry began to adopt voluntary widespread enrichment (fortification) of wheat flour with vitamins, folic acid, and iron, the outcome of a recommendation by the National Nutrition Conference for Defense, charged with investigating the causes of poor health among many World War II recruits. By 1942, some 75 percent of breads in the United States were fortified. Mandatory fortification requirements went into effect in 1943, following the publication of the first U.S. government recommended dietary allowances. The removal of naturally occurring nutrients that occurs in grain processing led to a number of diseases caused by nutritional deficiency, including beriberi, pellagra, neural tube defect, and iron deficiency anemia. Enrichment helped eradicate or reduce the frequency of these conditions in the United States.

Policy

Under the Wilson administration during World War I, the U.S. Food Administration, under the direction of Herbert Hoover, set a basic price of $2.20 per bushel. The end of the war led to "the closing of the bonanza export markets and the fall of sky-high farm prices", and wheat prices fell from more than $2.20 per bushel in 1919 to $1.01 in 1921. The McNary–Haugen Farm Relief Bill failed in Congress, and was followed by the Agricultural Marketing Act of 1929, the establishment of the Federal Farm Board, and the Agricultural Adjustment Act of 1933.
The most important legislation for wheat production in the United States today are the farm bills which authorized farm subsidies, the Conservation Reserve Program, and other programs. Adopted around every five years, the most recent farm bills are the 1985 farm bill, 1990 farm bill, 1996 farm bill, 2002 farm bill, and 2008 farm bill.

Wheat farmers are a major beneficiary of crop subsidies and other agricultural programs. According to U.S. Department of Agriculture data, from 1995 to 2012, the U.S. federal government paid over $39 billion in wheat subsidies, through direct payments (2003–present) and production flexibility contracts (1996-2002), deficiency payments, crop insurance premium subsidies, price support payments (including loan deficiency payments, marketing loan gains, and certificates), counter-cyclical programs, market loss assistance, and other wheat programs.

Production

The United States is a major wheat-producing country, with output typically exceeded only by China, the European Union, and India. Acreage brought under wheat has, over the last several decades, varied with the wheat price. During the first decade of the 2000s, wheat ranked third among U.S. field crops in both planted acreage and gross farm income; the first two positions were held by corn and soybeans. The acreage has gone down by nearly 30% (to 48,653,000 acres in 2001, as against 60-63 million acres harvested annually in the previous years; 30 of this area is in Texas.) The amount exported has also declined. The acreage reduction was dictated by the Acreage Reduction Program (ARP), which was introduced for wheat, feed grains, and cotton; and production faces pressures from multiple factors.

Environmental aspects

It is generally accepted that wheat is beneficial to grow in the off season compared to other crops as its planting occurs, depending on the agro-climatic condition, in late fall or early spring. This results in reduced application of fertilizers and pesticides, and less need for irrigation, and helps in preventing soil erosion. However, some of the negative effects identified in a study conducted by the FAO are natural habitat loss due to encroachment into new lands after degraded lands are abandoned, loss of indigenous species affecting the biodiversity, and milling operation causing dust pollution. Historically, habitat conversion in the US has occurred in agropastoral land areas as in many other countries, and is considered a natural development. In the western US, habitat conversion is still an ongoing process because the subsidies provided by the government for wheat and other crops in the US have made it financially profitable to develop areas which otherwise would lie fallow; bluestem prairie is one such area. However, habitat expansion for wheat has stabilized since 2000.

Exports

Nearly 50% of the wheat produced in the US is exported, although the share of the world market has declined due to competition from the EU, Argentina, Australia, Canada, and also recently from Ukraine and Russia. The exported wheat varieties are hard red winter, white wheat (about 66%), Hard Red Spring (about 50%), Soft Red Winter, and durum wheat. However, the producers continue to increase exports as in the domestic market wheat products have not been competitive in recent years.

One of the widely criticized export policies of the US was the PL 480 (Public Law 480), instituted in 1954, which lasted until 1969. India had a major share of about 50% in receiving this aid under it. This policy was criticized because it had damaged the export potential of many countries, in particular Canada and Australia. It was also said that this policy discouraged countries from developing their own agriculture. In India, this aid "bankrupted large numbers of Indian farmers".

References

External links
Bin-buster: a Pictorial Story of the 1952 Wheat Crop - published by the Kansas State Board of Agriculture, 1952

Wheat production
Agricultural production in the United States
Grain industry of the United States
Cereals in the United States